This is a list of airports in Fiji, sorted by location.

Its immediate neighbors are Vanuatu to the west, New Caledonia to the southwest, New Zealand's Kermadec to the southeast, Tonga to the east, Wallis and Futuna to the northeast and Tuvalu to the north. The two major islands, Viti Levu and Vanua Levu, account for 87% of the population of almost 850,000. Fiji's capital and largest city is Suva, located on Viti Levu. Its major partners are Australia,  New Zealand,  United States, China , Japan ,South Korea , India and other nations for its dependence of importation and exportation. 



Airports in Fiji

International airports

Domestic airports 

Airport names shown in bold have scheduled passenger service on commercial airlines.

See also 
 Transport in Fiji
 List of airports by ICAO code: N#NF - Fiji, Tonga
 Wikipedia:WikiProject Aviation/Airline destination lists: Oceania#Fiji

References 
 
  - includes IATA codes
 Great Circle Mapper: Fiji - IATA and ICAO codes
 World Aero Data: Fiji - ICAO codes

 
Fiji
Airports
Airports
Fiji